Sampson House was a commercial office building in Hopton Street, Southwark, London, United Kingdom. It was sited just west of the Tate Modern art gallery, by the railway lines running onto Blackfriars Bridge and filled a block between the Thames and Southwark Street.

History
The building was designed in the Brutalist style, with heavy massing, extensive use of exposed concrete with minimal glazing at street level and horizontal mirror glazing in dark metal cladding in the projecting upper levels. It was built in 1976–1979 as a processing centre for Lloyds Bank and was designed by Fitzroy Robinson & Partners which was also architect for the construction (and refurbishment in 2004–2006) of 50 Queen Anne's Gate in Westminster.

Minerva plc announced in August 2005 that, in a linked transaction, it had completed the sale of Sampson House for £150.5 million and Ludgate House for £78.5 million to a private investor. The announcement also stated that "Sampson House comprises 386,288 sq.ft. of office space let to IBM UK Limited. The lease expires in December 2025 but, includes a mutual break clause in June 2018. The current rent is £8 million p.a. and will rise to £9.5 million p.a. in December this year". IBM utilised the building's extensive and deep basement levels to host data centres for the company's London based customers, with recovery facilities utilising the above-ground office space.

The nearest Underground station to the site of Sampson House is Southwark on the Jubilee line.

On 8 October 2013, Southwark London Borough Council approved plans to build an apartment building complex, at the Sampson House and Ludgate House sites. The heights of the planned apartment blocks ranges from 5 to 49 storeys.

The demolition of Sampson House started in late 2018 and took a year to complete.

References

Further reading
Architect (London), The South Bank: Sampson House - Lloyds Bank's new operations centre; Architects: Fitzroy Robinson & Partners, vol. 125, no. 6, 1979 June, p. 14-18
Building, Finance factories - two large computer centres in the heart of London: 1. Lloyds Bank Operations Centre Sampson House, on the south side of Blackfriars Bridge; Architects: Fitzroy Robinson & Partners; 2. National Westminster Bank Services Centre, Alie Street, E1; Architects: Elsom Pack & Roberts Partnership, vol. 236, no. 7090 (22), 1979 Jun 1, p. 24-26.

External links
Ludgate House and Sampson House redevelopment website

Buildings and structures completed in 1979
Office buildings in the London Borough of Southwark
Brutalist architecture in London